= Stories of Jesus =

- Genre: Religious programming
- Country of origin: Australia
- Original language: English

Production
- Running time: 10 minutes

Original release
- Network: ABC Television
- Release: 1957 – 1958

Stories of Jesus is an Australian television series which aired from 1957 to 1958. It was shown on ABC in Melbourne and Sydney, the only two cities in Australia which had television at the time. As the title suggests, it was a religious series. It aired in a 10-minute time-slot. It is not known how many episodes were produced. Remarkably, despite the mass wiping of ABC archival material in the 1970s, the National Film and Sound Archive holds four episodes, though one of these prints is missing the soundtrack.
